The Jiangyin Yangtze River Bridge is a suspension bridge over the Yangtze River in Jiangsu, China. The bridge has a main span of  connects Jiangyin south of the river to Jingjiang to the north.  When the bridge was completed in 1999, it was the fourth longest suspension bridge span in the world and the longest in China. Several longer bridges have since been completed in China and abroad, and it is currently the 15th longest suspension bridge in the world.  The bridge was also the furthest downstream on the Yangtze until the completion of the Sutong Yangtze River Bridge in 2008 and the Chongming–Qidong Yangtze River Bridge in 2011.

Locale
Located in the centre of the Jiangsu Province, the bridge carries traffic on the G2 Beijing-Shanghai Expressway. There are three lanes in both directions and pedestrian sidewalks. The location was selected due to the narrow width of the river at the bridge.

History
The bridge was planned so that it would be completed in time to mark the 50th anniversary of the Chinese Revolution of 1947. It was the first long-span bridge of its kind to be designed in China. Foundation work began in 1994. Engineering, manufacture and construction of the bridge was completed in just less than three years. The main span, constructed by Cleveland Bridge & Engineering Company, is made of flat streamlined steel box girders. The steel deck was erected by raising pre-assembled units weighing up to 500 metric tons with jacks. ( pictures)  The total investment of the bridge adds up to 2.728 billion yuan. The bridge opened on September 28, 1999. Jiang Zemin entitled the bridge and cut the ribbon. Goodwin Steel Castings manufactured the cable bands for the bridge.

In 2002 the bridge received an award at the International Bridge Conference for "...outstanding achievement in bridge engineering that, through vision and innovation, provides an icon to the community for which it was designed."

See also

List of longest suspension bridge spans
List of tallest bridges in the world
List of bridges in China
Yangtze River bridges and tunnels

References

External links 

Information on the bridge from the contractor that built it
 
 Photos and locations from Google Earth

Bridges over the Yangtze River
Suspension bridges in China
Bridges completed in 1999
1999 establishments in China